The 107th Attack Wing (107 ATKW) is a unit of the New York Air National Guard, stationed at Niagara Falls Air Reserve Station, New York. The 107th is equipped with the MQ-9 Reaper. If activated to federal service, the Wing is gained by the United States Air Force's Air Combat Command.

The mission of the 107th Attack Wing mission is to provide "Global Vigilance and Strike Capability in support of federal authorities while maintaining the highest level of readiness for state contingencies." New York Air National Guard personnel carry out the unit's mission by providing surveillance and strike support, maintenance, supply, transportation, contracting, communications, civil engineering, personnel, base services, security forces and medical functions.

History

World War II

The unit was formed at Hunter Army Airfield, Georgia, in August 1942 as the 339th Bombardment Group, a Third Air Force Operational Training Unit (OTU), equipped with A-24 Banshee dive bombers. Redesignated a fighter-bomber group in August 1943, the 339th moved to California in September 1943 as part of Desert Training Center in Mojave Desert.

After the A-24 was taken out of combat service, trained with P-39 Airacobras and became combat ready, being reassigned to VIII Fighter Command in England, April 1944. Redesignated the 339th Fighter Group, with the 503rd, 504th and 505th Fighter Squadrons, it was based at RAF Fowlmere, England.

Among all these varied activities, the outstanding feature of this group's combat record is the 235 enemy aircraft it destroyed in the air and 440 on the ground during its one year of operations.

The group returned to the United States in October and was inactivated on 18 October 1945.

New York Air National Guard
The wartime 339th Fighter Group was redesignated as the 107th Fighter Group, and was allotted to the New York Air National Guard, on 24 May 1946. It was organized at Niagara Falls Municipal Airport, New York, and was extended federal recognition on 8 December 1948 and activated by the National Guard Bureau. The 107th Fighter Group was bestowed the lineage, history, honors, and colors of the 339th Fighter Group and all predecessor units.  It was assigned to the NY Air National Guard 52d Fighter Wing.

Due to its air defense commitment, the group's 136th Fighter-Interceptor Squadron was not mobilized during the 1991 Gulf Crisis. However, the 107th Fighter-Interceptor Group deployed firefighter and medical personnel as backfilled personnel to stateside bases vacated by active-duty personnel deployed to the Middle East.

In 1992, with the end of the Cold War, the 107th adopted the Air Force Objective Organization plan, and the unit was re-designated as the 107th Fighter Group.   On 1 October 1995, in accordance with the Air Force "One Base - One Wing" policy, the 107th Fighter Wing was established and the 136th Fighter Squadron was assigned to the new 107th Operations Group.

With the arrival of the KC-135R Stratotanker in March 1994, the 107th Fighter Wing converted from an air defense to an aerial refueling mission and was re-designated as the 107th Air Refueling Wing.  The wing also used the KC-135R as a cargo and passenger transport.

In mid-1996, the Air Force, in response to budget cuts, and changing world situations, began experimenting with Air Expeditionary organizations. The Air Expeditionary Force (AEF) concept was developed that would mix Active-Duty, Reserve and Air National Guard elements into a combined force. Instead of entire permanent units deploying as "Provisional" as in the 1991 Gulf War, Expeditionary units are composed of "aviation packages" from several wings, including active-duty Air Force, the Air Force Reserve Command and the Air National Guard, would be married together to carry out the assigned deployment rotation.

Since 1996, the 136th Expeditionary Air Refueling Squadron was formed and deployed in support of world contingencies including Operations to include, but not limited to, Strong Resolve 2002, Operation Uphold Democracy, Operation Deny Flight, Operation Decisive Endeavor, Operation Noble Eagle, Operation Enduring Freedom, Operation Iraqi Freedom and the Northeast Tanker Task Force.

In November 2007, the wing was notified that it would become an airlift unit. This was directed by the 2005 Base Realignment and Closure Commission decisions.  It became an associate unit to the Air Force Reserve Command 914th Airlift Wing that was already based at Niagara Falls.  The 914th Airlift Wing was transferred responsibility for the C-130H2 Hercules aircraft used by the 136th, and airmen from both units jointly operated them.  With this change, the Niagara Falls Air Reserve Station received additional C-130 aircraft from the Tennessee ANG 118th Airlift Wing in Nashville. Tennessee.   The 136th Expeditionary Airlift Squadron has deployed to both Iraq and Afghanistan in support of Operation Iraqi Freedom and Operation Enduring Freedom.

During Hurricane Sandy in late October 2012, members of the unit deployed to New York City and Long Island to assist in recovery operations.  The unit was deployed first to Stewart Air National Guard Base in Newburgh and then traveled to Peekskill, which is in Westchester County.  As part of the recovery effort, unit members performed road clearing, traffic control, helping displaced personnel with feeding and getting them back in their housing and getting them out of flood-stricken areas.

It was announced in early 2012 that federal budget reductions would affect the mission of the 107th Airlift Wing. During 2014 the 107th began transitioning to the MQ-9 Reaper unmanned aircraft mission from the C-130 mission, having flown the last C-130 flight in December 2015. The 107th was officially re-designated the 107th Attack Wing on 15 March 2017. As a result, the association between the 107th AW and the 914th AW of the Air Force Reserves, has ended and all C-130H2 aircraft transferred into sole possession of the 914th AW. The 107th is the second New York Air National Guard wing to assume the remotely piloted aircraft mission.

Major units of the 107th Attack Wing include:
 107th Operations Group
 136th Attack Squadron
 274th Air Support Operations Squadron
 222nd Command and Control Squadron
 107th Mission Support Group
 107th Medical Group

Lineage

 Constituted as 339th Bombardment Group (Dive) on 3 August 1942
 Activated on 10 August 1942
 Re-designated 339th Fighter-Bomber Group in August 1943
 Re-designated 339th Fighter Group in May 1944
 Inactivated on 18 October 1945
 Re-designated: 107th Fighter Group, and allotted to New York National Guard, on 24 May 1946.
 Received federal recognition and activated on 8 December 1948
 Established as 107th Fighter Wing, 1 November 1950
 107th Fighter Group assigned as subordinate unit
 Re-designated: 107th Fighter-Interceptor Wing, 1 December 1952
 Group re-designated 107th Fighter-Interceptor Group
 Re-designated: 107th Air Defense Wing, 1 May 1956
 Group re-designated: 107th Fighter Group (Air Defense)
 Re-designated: 107th Tactical Fighter Wing, 10 November 1958
 Group re-designated: 107th Tactical Fighter Group
 107th Tactical Fighter Wing headquarters inactivated, reorganized as group 15 October 1962
 Re-designated: 107th Fighter-Interceptor Group, 1 June 1971
 Re-designated: 107th Fighter Group, 15 March 1992
 Re-designated: 107th Air Refueling Group, 16 July 1994
 107th Air Refueling Wing re-activated, 1 October 1995
 Group re-designated: 107th Operations Group
 Re-designated: 107th Airlift Wing, 1 July 2008
 Re-designated: 107th Attack Wing, 15 March 2017

Assignments
 III Fighter Command, 10 August 1942
 IV Fighter Command, 1 September 1943
 66th Fighter Wing, 4 April 1944
 Attached to: 3d Bombardment (later Air) Division 15 September 1944 – October 1945
 52d Fighter Wing, 8 December 1948
 New York Air National Guard, 1 November 1950
 Gained by: Eastern Air Defense Force, Air Defense Command
 Gained by: Tactical Air Command, 10 November 1958
 Gained by: 21st Air Division, Aerospace Defense Command, 1 June 1971
 Gained by: Air Defense, Tactical Air Command, 1 October 1979
 Gained by: Northeast Air Defense Sector, 1 July 1987
 Gained by: Air Mobility Command, 1 July 1994-Present

Components
 105th Fighter (Air Defense) (Later Tactical Fighter) Group, 1 May 1956 – 1 July 1962
 107th Fighter (Later Fighter-Interceptor, Fighter (Air Defense), Tactical Fighter, Operations) Group, 1 May 1956 – 1 July 1962; 1 October 1995 – Present
 109th Fighter (Air Defense) (Later Tactical Fighter) Group, 1 May 1956 – 1 July 1962
 482d Bombardment (later 503d Fighter) Squadron (D7) 10 August 1942 – 18 October 1945
 Re-designated: 136th Fighter (later Fighter-Interceptor, Tactical Fighter, Fighter, Air Refueling, Airlift) Squadron, 8 December 1948-Present
 
 483d Bombardment (later 504th Fighter) Squadron (5Q) 10 August 1942 – 18 October 1945
 Re-designated: 137th Fighter (Later Fighter-Interceptor) Squadron, 28 October 1947 – 1 May 1956

 484th Bombardment (later 505th Fighter) Squadron (6N) 10 August 1942 – 18 October 1945
 Re-designated: 138th Fighter (Later Fighter-Interceptor) Squadron, 28 October 1947--1 May 1956

 139th Fighter (Later Fighter-Interceptor) Squadron, 28 October 1947 – 1 May 1956

Stations

 Hunter Field, Georgia, 10 August 1942
 Drew Field, Florida, February 1943
 Walterboro Army Airfield, South Carolina, July 1943
 Rice Army Airfield, California, 1 September 1943— March 1944
 RAF Fowlmere (AAF-378), England, 4 April 1944— October 1945
 Camp Kilmer, New Jersey, C. 16–18 October 1945

 Niagara Falls Municipal Airport, New York, 8 December 1948
 107th Fighter Group (Air Defense) operated from: Hancock Field, Syracuse, New York, 1 May 1956 – 30 June 1962
 Niagara Falls International Airport, 1 July 1985
 Detachment operated from Charleston Air Force Base, South Carolina, July 1986 – June 1994
 Designated: Niagara Falls Air Reserve Station, New York, 1991-Present

Aircraft

 A-24 Banshee, 1942-1943
 P-39 Airacobra, 1943-1944
 P-51D Mustang, 1944-1945
 F-47D Thunderbolt, 1948-1952
 F-51H Mustang, 1952-1954
 F-94B Starfire, 1954-1957
 F-86H Sabre, 1957-1960

 F-100C Super Sabre, 1960-1971
 F-101B Voodoo, 1971-1982
 F-4C Phantom II, 1982-1986
 F-4D Phantom II, 1986-1990
 Block 15 ADF F-16A/B Fighting Falcon, 1990-1994
 KC-135R Stratotanker, 1994-2008
 C-130H Hercules, 2008–2015
MQ-9 Reaper, 2014–Present

References

 Maurer, Maurer (1983). Air Force Combat Units of World War II. Maxwell AFB, Alabama: Office of Air Force History. .
 Rogers, B. (2006). United States Air Force Unit Designations Since 1978. 
  Cornett, Lloyd H. and Johnson, Mildred W., A Handbook of Aerospace Defense Organization  1946 - 1980, Office of History, Aerospace Defense Center, Peterson AFB, CO (1980). 
 New York Department of Military Affairs Adjutant General Reports, 1846-1988

External links
107th Air Refueling Wing Official Homepage
Invitation to see the KC-135's sendoff ceremony

0107
Wings of the United States Air National Guard
Military units and formations in New York (state)
Military units and formations established in 1942
1942 establishments in Georgia (U.S. state)